The Daily Commercial is a daily newspaper distributed in Lake and Sumter counties, Florida. It was founded in 1875.

The Daily Commercial was acquired by members of the Cowles family in 1969. The New York Times Company acquired the paper in 1971 and sold it in 1995 to Better Built. HarborPoint Media acquired the Better Built papers in 2004, and owned the Daily Commercial until 2013, when it was acquired by Halifax Media Group. In 2015, Halifax was acquired by New Media Investment Group.

Prices 
The Daily Commercial prices are 50 cents daily; $1.00 Sunday.

References

External links 
  

Newspapers published in Florida
Publications established in 1875
Daily newspapers published in the United States
1875 establishments in Florida
Gannett publications